Heliamphora neblinae is a species of marsh pitcher plant endemic to Cerro de la Neblina, Cerro Aracamuni and Cerro Avispa in Venezuela. It is one of the most variable species in the genus and was once considered to be a variety of H. tatei. It is unclear whether or not there is a consensus regarding its status as a species, with at least a few researchers supporting the taxonomic revision that would elevate both H. tatei var. neblinae and H. tatei f. macdonaldae to full species status.

The pitchers of H. neblinae are some of the largest in the genus, occasionally exceeding 50 cm.

Infraspecific taxa

Heliamphora neblinae var. parva Maguire (1978) [=H. parva]
Heliamphora neblinae var. viridis Maguire (1978) [=H. parva]

References

Further reading

  Brewer-Carías, C. (September 1972).  Natura 48/49: 4–7.
  Brewer-Carías, C. (May 1973).  Defensa de la Naturaleza 2(6): 17–26.
  Brewer-Carías, C. (2011–2012). La Neblina: el tepuy más alto y remoto. Río Verde 6: 61–74.
  Brewer-Carías, C. (2012–2013).  Río Verde 9: 73–88.
 Jaffé, K., M.S. Blum, H.M. Fales, R.T. Mason & A. Cabrera (1995). On insect attractants from pitcher plants of the genus Heliamphora (Sarraceniaceae). Journal of Chemical Ecology 21(3): 379–384.  
 McPherson, S. (2007). Pitcher Plants of the Americas. The McDonald & Woodward Publishing Company, Blacksburg, Virginia.
 Nerz, J. & A. Wistuba (June 2000). Heliamphora hispida (Sarraceniaceae), a new species from Cerro Neblina, Brazil-Venezuela. Carnivorous Plant Newsletter 29(2): 37–41.
 Nerz, J. (December 2004). Heliamphora elongata (Sarraceniaceae), a new species from Ilu-Tepui. Carnivorous Plant Newsletter 33(4): 111–116.
 Wistuba, A., T. Carow & P. Harbarth (September 2002). Heliamphora chimantensis, a new species of Heliamphora (Sarraceniaceae) from the ‘Macizo de Chimanta’ in the south of Venezuela. Carnivorous Plant Newsletter 31(3): 78–82.

neblinae
Flora of Venezuela
Taxa named by Bassett Maguire
Flora of the Tepuis